The Gate II: Trespassers (also known as Gate II: Return to the Nightmare) is a 1990 horror film and a sequel to the 1987 film The Gate. It was directed by Tibor Takács and was a co-production between the United States and Canada. Louis Tripp reprises his role as Terrence "Terry" Chandler, a teenager who opens a gate to Hell.

Plot
It has been five years since Terry (now known as Terrence) and his friend, Glen, accidentally opened up the Gate in Glen's back yard, releasing demonic forces that the two of them had to banish. Glen and his family have moved away, and Terrence's broken family has grown worse. Still grieving over his mother's death, and with his dad wallowing in alcoholism, Terrence finds himself increasingly drawn to the evil portal and the power it possesses.

Terrence breaks into Glen's old house and begins the ritual to summon the demons and grant him the power to get his father's life back on track. He is interrupted by three other teens who also broke into the house. While John and Moe are content to ridicule Terrence, John's girlfriend, Liz is extremely interested in demonology and convinces her two friends to join Terrence in completing the ritual. Terrence summons a Minion (one of the small creatures that ran amok previously) through the Gate. In a panic, John pulls out his revolver and shoots it, then storms off with his friends in tow. Alone, Terrence retrieves the Minion's body and takes it home. It survives, so Terrance opts to keep it in a cage as a pet.

The next day, Terrence finds that his wish has seemingly come true. His father, once a proud airline pilot, has given up the bottle and netted a job flying for a major carrier. When Liz comes over later, they discover they can use the Minion to grant any wish they want, but with dire consequences.

Liz burns an effigy of her car pin to make a real one. John and Moe create money and binge at an expensive restaurant after stealing the minion and trashing Terrence's house. The minion gets loose and attacks the boys, infecting them both.

John and Moe transform into demons. They kidnap Liz to sacrifice her. Previously Liz and Terrence imbued an old jewelry box belonging to his mother as a vessel of light to destroy the darkness.

Terrence is brought to the dark world by the demonic John and Moe and transformed into a demon. He is tasked with sacrificing Liz to the Darkness. Terrence fights to save Liz and hurls the box into the gate. It explodes with light and they are transported back to Earth. Terrence dies.

After the funeral, Terrence emerges from the coffin and kisses Liz. After they leave, John and Moe also emerge from the coffin. Seeing Liz and Terry together, they state, "Who needs chicks, when you got demons!" In a post-credits scene, Terrence's hamster, previously sacrificed by John to open the portal, has also been restored to life and exits the coffin.

Cast
 Louis Tripp as Terry Chandler
 Simon Reynolds as Moe
 James Villemaire as John
 Pamela Adlon as Liz (as Pamela Segall)
 Neil Munro as Art
 James Kidnie as Mr. Coleson
 Gerry Mendicino as Maitre d'
 Andrea Ladányi as Minon
 Elva Mai Hoover as Doctor
 Irene Pauzer as Teacher
 Todd Waite as Wine Steward
 Layne Coleman as Priest

Release
The Gate II opened in 350 theaters in the US on February 28, 1992, and grossed $2 million.

The film was released on VHS in the US later in 1992 by Columbia Tristar Home Video. In October 2017, Scream Factory announced their intention to release The Gate II on Blu-ray on February 20, 2018.

Reception
Kevin Thomas of the Los Angeles Times wrote that the film "doesn't generate as much fun and excitement as the original", but it is likely to enjoyed by fans of The Gate. TV Guide rated it 2/4 stars and called it "an extended, updated riff" on traditional fairy tales about the dangers of wish fulfillment.

References

External links
 
 
 
 

1990 films
1990 animated films
1990 horror films
1990 independent films
English-language Canadian films
Canadian supernatural horror films
Canadian independent films
American supernatural horror films
American independent films
1990s English-language films
Films using stop-motion animation
Films with live action and animation
Films directed by Tibor Takács
1990s American films
1990s Canadian films